Tembek a Q-Flex ship is the first liquefied natural gas (LNG) carrier to berth at Milford Haven
at the South Hook LNG terminal.

Technical dates

The auxiliary boilers EB150120 and MB0106DS08 were designed and manufactured by Kangrim. The emergency diesel generator power unit (KTA38-D(M)) was produced by Cummins Inc.

The five main generator engines (7L32/40) were of MAN Diesel SE manufacture.

The two main propulsion engines are diesel (6S70ME-C) and were supplied by MAN B&W.

The two propellers are mono-block and were supplied by MMG (Mecklenburger Metallguss).

Speed recorded (Max / Average) 	20.4 / 18.4 knots

References

LNG tankers
2006 ships